"Bloodstone" is a song by Australian singer Guy Sebastian. It was released on 20 October 2017 as the second single from Sebastian's eighth studio album, Conscious.

Sebastian told the Herald Sun how a near break-up with wife Jules was the inspiration for the song. He said: "I remember trying to break up with Jules years and years ago, way before kids. Jules was actually like, 'we've got a history and you're just having a down moment, let's just push through it'. Jules was just straight up and said, 'you're an idiot'. In hindsight I was because I would have lost something really special." Sebastian told The Daily Telegraph: "It is about fighting for all sorts of love in all shapes and sizes."

Reception
In a review of the album, Leigh Sanders from Star and Express said: "His range takes on almost Mariah Carey-like changes which are almost just showing off compared to us mere singing mortals."

Charts

Certifications

Release history

References

2017 songs
2017 singles
Guy Sebastian songs
Sony Music Australia singles
Songs written by Guy Sebastian